Fitoor is a 2021 Pakistani television series, directed by Siraj-ul-Haque and written by Zanjabeel Asim Shah. It was produced by Abdullah Kadwani and Asad Qureshi under their banner 7th Sky Entertainment. It premiered on 14 January 2021 on Geo Entertainment. It stars Faysal Qureshi, Hiba Bukhari, Wahaj Ali and Kiran Haq in lead roles. 

Fitoor narrates the story of four people whose future is connected by their past. It is a love story that transcends above all, as a person in love is bound to forget about the worries of the past and the uncertainty of the future.

The drama was mixed-received by the audience in Pakistan and overseas though it remained the slot leader during its entire run and achieved a tremendous number of views on YouTube.

Plot
Hamza and Dilnasheen are deeply in love with each other and intend to get married. However, fate intervenes and Haider, who otherwise lives a lonely life with memories of his past love interest, Mehmal, sees Dilnasheen at a relative's wedding and feels an instant attraction towards her. Mehmal, whose marriage has failed, comes back into Haider's life. The four cross paths with each other and a saga of intense love, confessions, realisations, convictions, heartbreaks, revenge, enmity, and rebellion begins.

Cast

Main 
Faysal Qureshi as Haider. Haider wants to forget about his painful past and move on with his wife, Dilnasheen. He is a middle-aged, self-made rich businessman who deeply cares about those around him. He was dumped by Mehmal when he was young as he was not rich then. He worked his way up to become a successful CEO of an architecture firm. He decides to marry Dilnasheen after years of loneliness as he is attracted to her at first sight.

Wahaj Ali as Hamza. Hamza is a very emotional and chaotic character. His obsession (fitoor) is to get the love of his life, Dilnasheen, back. He is the son of a rich and powerful businessman. He is madly in love with Dilnasheen but his parents were not willing to let them get married as they thought Dilnasheen, who was from a middle-class background, would not fit in their elite life. This causes Hamza to attempt suicide but he is rescued by his father who now accepts Dilnasheen. But all in vain, after Dilnasheen's marriage to Haider, a heartbroken Hamza goes abroad and gives in to drug abuse. He later returns after his father's demise and begins his pursuit to marry Dilnasheen.

Hiba Bukhari as Dilnasheen. She is a beautiful and simple girl. She wants to sustain her forced marriage like a typical Pakistani girl. She was actually in love with Hamza, but due to family pressure, she marries Haider. After her marriage, she becomes extremely faithful towards him and concentrates on her marriage but her relation with Haider deteriorates due to Mehmal's ulterior motives. She is continuously haunted by her past love affair with Hamza.
Kiran Haq as Mehmal. She cherishes a lavish lifestyle and can go to any heights to maintain it. She dumped Haider but now her wish is to get back to him. She is greedy and married Ansab for money but he was abusive towards her. She realised her mistake of not accepting Haider and comes back to his life, thus creating difficulties for Dilnasheen.
Ismat Zaidi as Bushra, Haider's mother. She is an overprotective and supportive mother who wants to see her children happy but also criticizes them when needed. She supports Dilnasheen over Mehmal and apologizes to her when she doubts her. Her revelation of her own past to her son makes him realize its okay to have a past and he forgives Dilnasheen.

Supporting 
Saba Hameed as Aneesa, Dilnasheen's mother
Tanveer Jamal as Sadiq, Rida and Hamza's father
Farhan Ally Agha as Asim, Haider's brother in law
Annie Zaidi as Kulsoom, Hamza and Rida's mother
Tipu Sharif as Ansab, Mehmal's ex-husband
Kamran Jeelani as Yawar, Dilnasheen's brother
Mizna Waqas as Afia, Sara's and Dilnasheen's sister-in-law
Fahima Awan as Sara, Haider's sister and Asim's wife
Zohreh Amir as Rida, Hamza's sister 
Saife Hassan as Haroon, Afsiya's father
Kanwal Khan as Afsiya, Haroon's daughter
Aayat Arif as Eshal, Mehmal and Ansab's daughter

Production

Casting
In the last quarter of 2020, it was reported that Faysal Qureshi, Hiba Bukhari, Wahaj Ali and Kiran Haq had been cast as lead characters for a 7th Sky project. The project reunited Faysal Qureshi with Bashar Momin writer Zanjabeel Asim. It marked the third collaboration between Faysal Qureshi and 7th Sky production, with the other two being Muqaddar and Meri Zaat Zarra-e-Benishan. The serial also marked the second collaboration of the trio director Siraj-ul-Haque, Kiran Haq, and Hiba Bukhari after their serial Ramz-e-Ishq, whereas it was the first time Wahaj appeared in a project of 7th Sky production.

Filming
The shooting of the serial took place in Karachi during late 2020 and early 2021.

Reception
The Brown Identity praised the series and Wahaj Ali's performance in particular by writing: "Overall Fitoor is a winning show which manages to bring the drama viewers want along with great performances. Continuing to be the one-man show where Wahaj Ali is delivering the strongest performance and is stealing the show".DAWN Images listed it among the toxic love stories of television.

Soundtrack

The original soundtrack of Fitoor "Koi Aisa Dard" was sung and composed by Shani Arshad, and Aima Baig lent her voice for female vocals. The OST was released on 23 February 2021, on TV as well as digitally on YouTube, and, as of March 2022, has more than 35 million views on YouTube.

Accolades

Lux Style Awards

References

External links 
 
 Fitoor on Har Pal Geo 
 Fitoor on 7th Sky Entertainment

Urdu-language television shows
Geo TV original programming
Pakistani drama television series
2021 Pakistani television series debuts